The Koga Cycling Team was a Dutch UCI Continental cycling team that existed from 1999 to 2014.

References

Defunct cycling teams based in the Netherlands
Cycling teams established in 1999
Cycling teams disestablished in 2014
UCI Continental Teams (Europe)
1999 establishments in the Netherlands